The 1969 European Junior Badminton Championships was the first ever edition of the European Junior Badminton Championships. It was held in Leidschendam-Voorburg, Netherlands, in the month of April. Danish players won both the singles disciplines, England won Boys' doubles, host Netherlands won Girls' doubles while Sweden bagged mixed doubles title.

Medalists

Results

Semi-finals

Finals

Medal table

References 

European Junior Badminton Championships
European Junior Badminton Championships
European Junior Badminton Championships
European Junior Badminton Championships
International sports competitions hosted by the Netherlands